The Senate Banking Subcommittee on Financial Institutions and Consumer Protection is one of five subcommittees within the Senate Committee on Banking, Housing, and Urban Affairs.

Jurisdiction
The Subcommittee on Financial Institutions oversees banks, savings associations, credit unions and other financial institutions, including deposit insurance, and e-commerce. It also oversees the Federal Home Loan Bank System, regulatory activities of the Federal Reserve System, the Office of the Comptroller of the Currency and the Office of Thrift Supervision within the Treasury Department, the Federal Deposit Insurance Corporation (FDIC), and the National Credit Union Administration

Members, 118th Congress

Historical subcommittee rosters

117th Congress

See also

U.S. House Financial Services Subcommittee on Financial Institutions and Consumer Credit

External links
U.S. Senate Committee on Banking, Housing, and Urban Affairs
Senate Banking Committee subcommittee list and membership page
 

Banking Senate Financial Institutions